Izïa Higelin (born 24 September 1990), more commonly known by her stage name Izia, is a French rock singer, guitarist and actress. Her most recent album, La Vitesse, was released in 2022.

Early life

Izïa was born in  Paris on 24 September 1990 to Jacques Higelin, a famous French singer of Belgian and Alsatian descent, and Aziza Zakine, a dancer and chorist of Tunisian descent. She comes from a family of artists; beside her father and mother, her two half brothers are Arthur H and Kên Higelin. She was influenced by music from an early age when her father introduced her to jazz and British pop music. At the age of seven, she formed a duo with her father; she provided the vocals while he played piano.

Career

Music
When she was 13 Izïa started to take an interest in rock bands such as Nirvana and Led Zeppelin. At this time, she wrote her first song, titled "Hey Bitch", which later featured on her debut album.

A year later she met Caravan Palace bassist Antoine Toustou through her parents and the pair played their first live show in 2004. Six months later, her backing group was expanded to three people when Izïa and Toustou were joined by Sébastien Hoog and Vincent Polycarpe. She left school at the age of 15 in order to concentrate on a career in music.

In 2006, Izïa released her first extended play and the following year she opened for Iggy & the Stooges at the Printemps de Bourges music festival. She consequently embarked on a tour of France, which consisted of over thirty dates. On 8 June 2009, her eponymous debut studio album, Izia was released in France. In some reviews, the album garnered comparisons to Janis Joplin. The album performed reasonably well in the French albums chart, achieving a peak position of #31 and staying in the top 100 for 17 consecutive weeks.

Izïa has since released three more albums that reached the charts in France: So Much Trouble (2011), La Vague (2015), and Citadelle (2019). In 2021, Izïa contributed a cover of the Metallica song "My Friend of Misery" to the charity tribute album The Metallica Blacklist.

Film
Izïa made her film debut in 2012, appearing in the film Bad Girl under her full name, Izia Higelin. She was nominated for several awards for her performance in the film, including the César Award for Most Promising Actress. Since then she has continued to act sporadically, appearing in the 2015 film Summertime and playing Camille Claudel in the 2017 film Rodin.

Discography

Studio albums

Singles

Filmography

References

External links 

 
Izia official Website

1990 births
Living people
Musicians from Paris
French rock musicians
French people of Belgian descent
French people of Tunisian descent
French film actresses
21st-century French actresses
Most Promising Actress César Award winners